USS O-2 (SS-63) was one of 16 O-class submarines built for the United States Navy during World War I.

Description
The O-class submarines were designed to meet a Navy requirement for coastal defense boats. They displaced  on the surface and  submerged. The O-class submarines had a crew of 29 officers and enlisted men.

For surface running, the boats were powered by two  diesel engines, each driving one propeller shaft. When submerged each propeller was driven by a  electric motor. They could reach  on the surface and  underwater.

The boats were armed with four 18-inch (450 mm)  torpedo tubes in the bow. They carried four reloads, for a total of eight torpedoes. The O-class submarines were also armed with a single 3"/50 caliber deck gun.

Construction and career
O-2 was laid down on 27 July 1917 by the Puget Sound Navy Yard. She was launched on 24 May 1918, and commissioned at Puget Sound on 19 October 1918.

Service history
During World War I, O-2 patrolled off the New England coast until war's end. Reclassified as a second line submarine on 25 July 1924, and reverting to a first liner on 6 June 1928, she served at the submarine base, New London, Connecticut, in training officers and men until 1931, except for a brief tour at Coco Solo, Panama Canal Zone, in 1924. In 1931, she transferred to Philadelphia, Pennsylvania, where she decommissioned on 25 June 1931.

With increasing possibility of U.S. involvement in World War II, O-2 recommissioned at Philadelphia on 3 February 1941. Steaming to New London in June, she trained submarine crews there until after Germany collapsed. She decommissioned on 26 July 1945, was struck on 11 August 1945, and was sold on 16 November 1945.

Awards
World War I Victory Medal
American Defense Service Medal
American Campaign Medal
World War II Victory Medal

Notes

References

External links
 

United States O-class submarines
World War I submarines of the United States
World War II submarines of the United States
Ships built in Vancouver, Washington
1918 ships